Silas Mainville Burroughs may refer to:

 Silas Mainville Burroughs (politician) (1810–1860), U.S. Representative from New York
 Silas Mainville Burroughs (pharmacist) (1846–1895), businessman and philanthropist